Talwar is an Indian (Khatri) surname that is found among the Sikhs and Hindus of Punjab. There are also some Muslim clans of Talwars. It is derived from the word "talvar" meaning sword. Talwar is a surname found among Barah-Ghar/Bahri sub-caste of the Khatris which also includes the clans of Chopra, Dhawan, Kakkar, Kapoor, Khanna, Mehra, Malhotra, Sehgal, Seth, Tandon, and Vohra.

Before 1947, Talwars were located in modern-day Pakistan, particularly western Punjab (Jhelum, Rawalpindi) and North-West Frontier Province (Peshawar, Hazara). Some Talwars were also found in the neighborhoods of Jhang city. A neighborhood in Rawalpindi called "Talwar'an da bazaar" is named after the Talwar clan. Some Talwars also trace their ancestry from Afghanistan.

Notable people 
 Aakash Talwar, Indian actor
 Aarushi Talwar, Indian murder victim
 Amar Talwar (born 1922), Indian actor
 Bhagat Ram Talwar, Indian independence activist
 Bhavna Talwar, Indian journalist and film director
 Gursaran Pran Talwar, Indian immunologist and medical researcher
 Hari Kishan Talwar, Indian independence activist 
 Isha Talwar, Indian actress
 Janak Raj Talwar, Indian surgeon
 K. K. Talwar, Indian cardiologist
 Ramesh Talwar, Indian film director
 Raj Kumar Talwar, Indian banker
 Rajesh Talwar, Indian writer and lawyer 
 Rohit Talwar, Indian cricketer
 Saanvi Talwar, Indian actress
 Sarkar Talwar, Indian cricketer
 Suman Talwar, Indian actor
 Vaibhav Talwar, Indian model and actor
 Vikram Talwar, Indian-American businessperson

References

Surnames of Indian origin
Punjabi-language surnames
Punjabi tribes
Indian surnames
Hindu surnames
Khatri clans
Khatri surnames